The Spire of Dublin, alternatively titled the Monument of Light, is a large, stainless steel, pin-like monument  in height, located on the site of the former Nelson's Pillar (and prior to that a statue of William Blakeney) on O'Connell Street, the main thoroughfare of Dublin, Ireland.

History

Following the bombing of Nelson's Pillar by former IRA members in 1966, and subsequent controlled demolition six days later of what was left, the site remained vacant for years as no decision could be reached on a suitable replacement. Eventually, the Anna Livia monument was installed on the site to celebrate the 1988 Dublin Millennium celebrations.

In 1998, as part of a planned multi-million euro re-development of O'Connell Street (as well as a memorial to the upcoming millennium and the aspirations of Ireland in the midst of its Celtic Tiger economic boom), a competition was launched to find a replacement for Nelson's Pillar. O'Connell Street had been in decline for a number of years due to the proliferation of fast-food restaurants, the opening of bargain shops using cheap plastic shop fronts, and proliferation of derelict sites along both sides of the road. The re-development plan, which was aimed for completion by 2004, hoped to move the street "away from the image of fast-food restaurants, to (that of) a 'family' place to go". As part of the project to improve the overall streetscape, a new granite plaza was promised and the number of trees in the central reservation, which had over-grown and obscured views and monuments, was reduced dramatically. This was controversial, as the trees had been growing for a century. Statues were cleaned and in some cases relocated. Shop-owners were required to replace plastic signage and frontage with more attractive designs. Traffic was re-directed where possible away from the street and the number of traffic lanes was reduced to make it more appealing to pedestrians. The centrepiece of this regeneration was to be the replacement monument for Nelson's Pillar.

The Spire, or Spire of Light, was chosen from a large number of submissions in an international competition by a committee chaired by the Lord Mayor of Dublin, Joe Doyle. Following an appeal by an objector, the plans were taken to the High Court, meaning that the monument was not ready for the Millennium celebrations in the year 2000. On 28 December 2000, after an Environmental Impact Study (EIS) had been carried out, Environment Minister Noel Dempsey announced that construction of the Monument of Light, or The Spike, had been approved and that construction of the monument would take nineteen months to complete. The announcement constituted a defeat for An Taisce, Ireland's non-governmental organisation active in the areas of the environment and built heritage, which had called for the spire's height to be reduced. Dempsey noted that Dublin Corporation had previously failed to complete an EIS in its haste to complete the monument quickly.

The spire was designed by Ian Ritchie of Ian Ritchie Architects, who sought an "Elegant and dynamic simplicity bridging art and technology". The contract was awarded to SIAC-Radley JV and it was manufactured by Radley Engineering of Dungarvan, County Waterford, and erected by SIAC Construction Ltd & GDW Engineering Ltd. The Anna Livia monument was eventually moved away to make room for the Spire in 2001.

Construction
The first section was installed on 18 December 2002. Construction of the sculpture was delayed because of difficulty in obtaining planning permission and environmental regulations. The Spire consists of eight hollow stainless steel cone sections, the longest being , which were installed on 21 January 2003. The total weight of the eight sections amounts to 133.15 tonnes. It features two tuned mass dampers inside the fifth section from the bottom, designed by engineers Arup, to counteract sway. The steel underwent shot peening to alter the quality of light reflected from it.

The pattern around the base of the Spire is based on a core sample of rock formation taken from the ground where the spire stands and the DNA double helix. The pattern was applied by bead blasting the steel through rubber stencil masks whose patterns were created by water jet cutting based on core sample drawings supplied by the contractor. The design around the  lower part of the Spire was created by the architects making a 3D pattern model combining the core sample and double helix and then digitally translated to a 2D image drawing supplied to the contractor and used by specialists for cutting the masking material.

At dusk, the base of the monument is lit and the top  is illuminated through 11,884 holes through which light-emitting diodes shine.

Reception
Some opposition initially greeted the monument. Supporters compare it to other initially unpopular urban structures such as the Eiffel Tower, while detractors complain that the Spire has little architectural or cultural connection to the city. Complaints were also aired about the danger posed by the monument to low-flying aircraft, as well as  the absence of a Christian message . It has inspired a number of nicknames, as is common with public art in Dublin, including the nail in the Pale, the stiletto in the ghetto, the pin in the bin, the stiffy by the Liffey, the spire in the mire, or the spike.

Award nominations
The monument has been nominated for the following awards:
2003 British Construction Industry International Award finalist
2004 RIBA National Award & Stirling Prize shortlist
2005 Mies Van der Rohe Prize list

Gallery

See also
 Iglica
 List of public art in Dublin

References

External links

 Construction Photographs
 Gallery of Spire maintenance pictures

Buildings and structures celebrating the third millennium
Buildings and structures completed in 2003
Buildings and structures in Dublin (city)
Monumental columns in the Republic of Ireland
Steel sculptures
21st-century architecture in the Republic of Ireland